The Vatican Necropolis lies under the Vatican City, at depths varying between 5–12 metres below Saint Peter's Basilica.  The Vatican sponsored archaeological excavations (also known by their Italian name scavi) under Saint Peter's in the years 1940–1949 which revealed parts of a necropolis dating to Imperial times.  The work was undertaken at the request of Pope Pius XI who wished to be buried as close as possible to Peter the Apostle. It is also home to the Tomb of the Julii, which has been dated to the third or fourth century.  The necropolis was not originally one of the Catacombs of Rome, but an open air cemetery with tombs and mausolea.

The Vatican Necropolis is not to be confused with the Vatican grottoes, the latter of which resulted from the construction of St. Peter's Church and is located on the ground level of the old Constantinian basilica.

Origins of the necropolis
The Vatican necropolis was originally a burial ground built on the southern slope of the Vatican Hill, adjacent to the Circus of Caligula.  In accordance with the Roman law, it was forbidden to bury the dead within the city walls. For this reason, burial grounds sprang up along the roads outside of the city cemeteries.  One of these streets, the Via Cornelia, ran north along the Vatican hill.

Caligula's Circus
At the top of the circus that Caligula built, an Egyptian obelisk had been placed. The obelisk had been there since ancient times; in 1586 it was moved from its original place by Domenico Fontana on the orders of Pope Sixtus V when St. Peter's Square was added.

The original location was just in front of the present-day Excavation Office (Ufficio Scavi) of the Fabbrica di San Pietro and is marked by a plaque in the ground.

Construction of Old St. Peter

According to tradition, the Apostle Peter was martyred in the year 64 or 67 during the reign of Emperor Nero. Peter is said to be buried in the necropolis because of its proximity to the Circus of Nero where he was martyred.  After the Edict of Milan the Emperor Constantine began construction of the first St. Peter's Church, also known as Old St. Peter's Basilica.  At this time, the Roman necropolis was still in use. This is known because a coin was found inside an urn dating from 318 AD. During this time, the necropolis was protected by law and was untouchable.  However, Emperor Constantine I decided to build a basilica, which would be located just above the supposed grave of the Apostle Peter. To obtain the necessary amount of flat area for the planned construction, Emperor Constantine I excavated part of the necropolis of the Vatican hill, which can be seen in the figure.  This caused the necropolis to be filled with soil and building debris, with the exception of St. Peter's tomb, which was preserved.

Excavations

20th century
The first excavations of the Necropolis occurred from 1940–1949 during the pontificate of Pius XII.  The purpose of these excavations was to locate the grave of St. Peter, which for centuries had been assumed to be beneath St. Peter's Basilica. A series of mausoleums were unearthed. The mausoleums were initially labeled with the Greek alphabet letters Φ (phi), Χ (chi) and Ψ (Psi). Later, Latin letters were used. The Mausoleum M had already been described in 1574, and Mausoleum O was discovered when it was unearthed during the construction of the foundation for the statue of Pope Pius VI.  Mausoleums R and S were discovered when the southern part of the foundation for the canopy of Gian Lorenzo Bernini was created.

First, the A mausoleum was built.  In later years, in rapid succession, the mausoleums B, C, D and E were built next to each other.  The Mausoleum G is very likely from the same time as Mausoleum B, while Mausoleum F was probably created during the reign of Antoninus Pius (138–161 AD).  These seven mausoleums were placed in a row, built as standalone buildings with different heights and forming an approximately 32-meter-long road. In later times, the gap was filled by mausoleums G and O and with other buildings.  In the reign of (Emperor) Hadrian, Mausoleum O was built.  Only Mausoleum H, from the second half of the 2nd Century, deviates from the straight row because of a pre-built Atrium. By this time the Circus was no longer in use; thus, it was no longer an obstacle to the spread of the necropolis to the south.  The Circus at the time was already overbuilt with various tombs.  A grave from the same time as the construction of Mausoleum H was found near the foundation of the obelisk.  When the Circus was eventually razed, to the already existing series of mausoleums was built another group, namely the Mausoleums Z, Φ (phi), Χ (chi) and Ψ (Psi). In the period from the end of the 2nd Century to the middle of the 3rd Century, mausoleums were built along with various freestanding buildings. All buildings except Mausoleum R1 had their entrance to the south, in the direction of the circus and the Via Cornelia.

The mausoleums had been used by many generations and shared by several families.  Archaeologists found around 120 burials in Mausoleum F and at least 170 in Mausoleum H.  An approximate calculation of the number of body and urn burials in the 22 excavated tombs yielded a number of more than 1,000 funerals.  This large number is due to the high infant mortality and low life expectancy in the 2nd Century CE.

The former owners of six mausoleums (A, C, H, L, N, and O) have been identified from inscriptions above the entrance door.  Mausoleum N is an example of a mausoleum that was used by different families at the same time.  The inscription reports that it is the mausoleum of Marcus Aebutius Charito, but that one half belongs to Lucius Volusius Successus and Volusia Megiste, who jointly purchased some of it.

21st century
More of the necropolis was unearthed in 2003 during construction of a car park. The site is now open to visitors.

Some tombs have undergone restorations, such as the ten-month project involving the Valerii Mausoleum.

St. Peter's Grave (Field P)

The field named P (Peter Campus) is the small area in which the suspected grave of the Apostle Peter is located. Peter was, according to tradition, after his martyrdom in the Circus Nero, buried here. Some 100 years after the death of Peter, a shrine was erected over his grave. This shrine is adjacent to the so-called Red Wall. Immediately adjacent to the suspected Peter grave, some other tombs were found. The arrangement of the graves suggests that the place of Peter's tomb was the site of some early veneration. The shrine, also called the "Trophy of Gaius", is named for the theologian Gaius of Rome who lived in Rome during the time of Pope Zephyrinus (198–217 CE). Consider this quote from Eusebius of Caesarea:

The Greek term used by Gaius——usually means a monument or a trophy of victory. Eusebius interpreted the quote 100 years later as an indication of honorific graves. On the right side of the "Trophy of Gaius" is attached at right angles, the so-called Graffiti Wall, named after the large number of Latin graffiti to be found there. During the excavations in the grave the mortal remains of the Apostle Peter were not found.  There were, however, in a marble-lined hole of the graffiti wall, some human bones.  The archaeologist Margherita Guarducci suggested that during the time of construction of the Constantinian basilica, the remains of the Apostle Peter were removed from his original grave and placed in the opening. The archaeologist pointed to inscriptions in the wall behind the pillar monument including the letters PETR… EN I, as the designation of Peter relics. Other archaeological sites in Rome also have similar graffiti, suggesting that therein is a commemoration (by Christians) to Peter and Paul as martyrs.
On 26 June 1968, Pope Paul VI announced that following scientific study, the relics of Saint Peter had been identified convincingly.

Guided tours
Tours of the excavations can be arranged with the Excavations Office in advance; for conservation, the number of visitors is limited. The tour lasts about an hour.

See also
 Index of Vatican City-related articles

References

External links

 Virtual tour through the Vatican Necropolis
 
 Margherita Guarducci's book on the Necropolis excavations

1940s archaeological discoveries
St. Peter's Basilica
Tourist attractions in Rome
Cemeteries in Vatican City
Necropoleis